Leo Dee (July 8, 1931 – November 22, 2004) was an American artist and teacher. A native of Newark, New Jersey, he achieved first regional and then national prominence for his "incredibly detailed" and realistic silverpoint drawings which conveyed "the softest and most subtle transitions of tonal values."

Early life and training
Dee was born in Newark, New Jersey on July 8, 1931. He attended Newark Arts High School, graduating in 1950 with a three-year scholarship to attend the Newark School of Fine and Industrial Arts. Drafted into the U.S. Army in 1953, he served two years in Fort Meade and, returning to civilian life, re-entered the Newark School of Fine and Industrial Arts under the G.I. Bill. While a student at that school, he took classes from instructors who had established reputations in their respective fields, including Leopold Matzal (portrait painting), James Rosati and Reuben Nakian (sculpture), and Ben Cunningham (color theory). Among them were two artists associated with the precisionist movement whose teaching had lasting influence on Dee's mature style. One of the two, Charles Goeller, showed Dee how to create realistic drawings in fine detail and the other, Hans Weingaertner, showed him how to make paintings having "precise and quiet form" and trompe l'oeil realism.

Mature style
When Newark's Rabin & Krueger Gallery gave Dee his first solo exhibition in 1957, he was making paintings in an abstract style. However, impressed by the gallery's display of silverpoint drawings by Joseph Stella, he subsequently made a transition to an austere style in that medium.

In 1958, Dee was hired to teach life drawing at the Newark School of Fine and Industrial Arts and soon thereafter a collage-drawing of his became the first of his works to be purchased by a major museum. This piece, Self-Portrait,  revealed his skill in the trompe l'oeil technique by means of which he was able to give the appearance of collage by the precise application of very fine lines. A critic for the New York Times wrote that the self-portrait was a "haunting image" having "great formal and emotional power." The technique soon became Dee's dominant style of drawing. A few years later when Newark Museum showed this drawing along with another called Reflections in White, critics remarked on the "superrealism" which he achieved, his "staggering technical perfection," and an apparent "intense concern for truth and purity." This technique shows up in a silverpoint drawing he made in 1964 called Musician.

In 1966, a drawing of Dee's appeared in a touring exhibition of 100 drawings sponsored by the American Federation of Arts. Reviewing the show for the New York Times, Grace Glueck, singled out a drawing called Death and Transfiguration as one of her two favorites. A few years later, the art gallery at Yale University purchased Paper Landscape, a silverpoint drawing which the authors of an art book describe as "a contemporary handling of the trompe l'œil technique where verisimilitude is the goal." In 1975, Dee was given a solo exhibition at the Coe Kerr Gallery, New York. The show brought together some of his paintings and reliefs as well as the silverpoint drawings for which he had achieved recognition. Writing in the New York Times, a critic admired the painstaking still-life draftsmanship of the drawings and said the other work was "unlikely to make history." Three years later, the New Jersey State Museum displayed twenty-seven of his drawings and two masonite reliefs in a show held in the main gallery. A reviewer noted that Dee made his subjects "come alive," eliminating superfluous elements and rendering them with great realism. "The viewer," she wrote, "is not merely getting a detailed rendition of the object, but also a feeling for the essence of that object… Though incredibly detailed, Dee's work is very modern in its approach."

During the 1980s and 1990s, Dee's drawings appeared in group exhibitions in New Jersey museums and galleries and critics continued to praise their fine draftsmanship and meticulous realism. His silverpoint work won praise, as well, for its "softness and spirituality." In 1978, a critic wrote that "Dee can make a piece of drapery come alive and can make you feel the sensuous curves of an apple, a pear or a lemon, or the mystery of the spiral chamber of a conch shell" and, the same year, he himself commented on this quality in his art. "In my drawings," he wrote, "I strive for elegance and a quality of magic. With a large, open portion of the surface, I seek to create a special universe for each object, giving it a life of its own. Finding human characteristics in a pear or lemon viewing landscapes in a crumpled piece of paper, I try to evoke the feeling that all of nature is one." In 2015, his silverpoint drawing, Paper Landscape, c. 1972, was exhibited in a group show at the National Gallery of Art and noted for its microscopic precision.

Art teacher

In 1958, Dee was appointed as instructor of drawing and painting in the Newark School Fine & Industrial Art. He later became the school's principal instructor of realistic drawing, retiring in 1993. Thereafter he taught evening classes at the  Visual Arts Center of New Jersey in Summit, N.J. and was periodically a visiting instructor at Seton Hall University, South Orange, N.J.

Personal information
Dee was born on July 8, 1931, in Newark, New Jersey. His parents were Leo J. Dee and Elenor K. Dee. It is suggested that his maternal grandmother, an artist who had attended the predecessor of the school where Dee learned and later taught art, influenced his decision to become an artist himself.

In 1963, Dee married the art historian and museum curator, Elaine Evans. She had previously been married to William H. Gerdts, the author of an essay on Dee that appeared in the catalog for Dee's solo show at the Coe Kerr Gallery in 1975.

In 1993, Dee retired from his teaching position at the Newark School of Fine and Industrial Arts and three years later, after short-term, part-time teaching stints in northern New Jersey, he and Elaine Evans moved permanently to Truro, Massachusetts, a village on Cape Cod where they had previously spent summer vacations. There, he continued to make silverpoint drawings using elements in the local landscape for his subjects. He died in Truro on November 22, 2004.

Other names

As his professional name, Dee used Leo Dee or sometimes Leo J. Dee. When young, he was known as Leo J. Dee, Jr. His friends and family called him Joe Dee.

Exhibitions

During the 1970s and 1980s, Dee exhibited frequently in New Jersey galleries and museums and occasionally, as well, in New York. This list is representative, not comprehensive. It comes from art web sites, galleries, a book, and many news accounts.

1957  solo, Rabin & Krueger, Newark, New Jersey
1957  group, "New Talents," Newark Foam Rubber Center, Newark, New Jersey
1959  group, Newark Museum, New Jersey
1963  group, "Forms in Contemporary Art," Newark Museum, New Jersey
1964  group, traveling exhibition of contemporary American drawings
1966  group, "Yesterday and Tomorrow," Mark of the Phoenix Gallery, New York
1966  group, "Meticulous Realism," Tawes Art Center, University of Maryland, College Park, Maryland
1966  group, "Art From New Jersey," New Jersey State Museum, Trenton
1966  group, "100 contemporary drawings," Drawing Society and American Federation of Arts, New York
1967  group, "Geometric Art: An Exhibition of Paintings and Constructions by Fourteen Contemporary New Jersey Artists," New Jersey State Museum, Trenton
1970  group, "Fourth Invitational Painting and Sculpture Exhibition," Van Deusen Gallery, Kent State University
1975  solo, retrospective exhibition, Coe Kerr Gallery, New York
1978  solo, "29 Drawings by Leo Dee," New Jersey State Museum, Trenton
1979  solo, "The Art of Leo Dee," New Jersey State Museum, Trenton
1980  group, "New Jersey Masters, 1980," Gill/St. Bernard's School, Gladstone, New Jersey
1981  group, Kean College Art Gallery, Union, New Jersey
1982  group, "The accessible joys of American still life," touring exhibition
1982  group, Coe Kerr Gallery, New York
1984  group, "B Orwell's '1984' Interpreted By New Jersey Artists," Newark Museum, New Jersey
1985  group, "Fifth New Jersey Artists Biennial," Newark Museum, New Jersey
1985  group, "The Fine Line," Norton Museum of Art, West Palm Beach, Florida
1991  group, "102 Prints," Newark Public Library, Newark, New Jersey
1991  group, "11th New Jersey Arts Annual Exhibition," Montclair Art Museum, Montclair, New Jersey
1992  group, "Aspects of Realism," Trenton State Museum, Trenton
1994  group, "More Than Meets the Eye," Morris Museum, Morristown, New Jersey
1998  group, "For Beauty and for Truth: The William and Abigail Gerdts Collection of American Still Life," Berry-Hill Galleries, New York
2005  solo, "Power Line: The Art of Leo Dee," Boston Athenæum, Boston, Massachusetts
2015  group, "Drawing in Silver and Gold: Leonardo to Jasper Johns," National Gallery of Art, Washington, D.C.

Collections

This list is representative, not comprehensive. It comes from art web sites and museums.

Columbus Museum, Columbus, Ohio
Cooper-Hewitt Museum, N.Y.
Fannie E. Rippel Foundation, Newark, N.J.
Fogg Museum, Harvard University, Cambridge, Mass.
Hunter Museum of American Art, Chattanooga, Tenn.
New Jersey State Museum, Trenton, N.J.
Newark Museum, Newark, N.J. 
Philadelphia Museum of Art, Philadelphia, Penn.
Springfield Museum of Art, Springfield, Mass.
Utah Museum of Fine Arts, Salt Lake City, Utah 
Yale University Art Gallery, New Haven, Conn.

Notes

References

1931 births
2004 deaths
Painters from New Jersey
Artists from Newark, New Jersey
20th-century American painters
American male painters
Modern artists
Newark Arts High School alumni
20th-century American male artists